Doom is an EP and the debut release by Arizonan death metal group Job for a Cowboy. It was released in 2005 through the independent Arizona label King of the Monsters, and later reissued in 2006 by Metal Blade Records. The EP is noted for being Job for a Cowboy's only deathcore release, as the band would later abandon the genre in favor of a modern death metal sound. Doom is also the only release to feature guitarist Andrew Arcurio.

Background
Doom was released on December 6, 2005 through the King of the Monsters label. It was then re-released on indie record label, Metal Blade Records in 2006.

The intro track "Catharsis for the Buried" features a distorted sample from the 1999 film Oxygen. A music video was created for the song "Entombment of a Machine" in which an elderly man is shown burying machines into the ground along with clips in between of the band performing in a desert-like atmosphere. It debuted as the band's first ever music video and was directed by Richie Valdez.

This is the only Job for a Cowboy release to feature their notorious "pig squeal" vocals.

Critical reception 

Despite the EP's overall popularity, the release garnered generally mixed to negative reception from critics. Many of the reviewers, however, made note of the band being at the forefront of the deathcore genre, which at the time was taking off in great numbers. Allmusic reviewer Cosmo Lee stated: "Doom is competent, but trades in sounds, not songs”, referring to the fact that Job for a Cowboy had changed their musical style with their follow-up release Genesis, a purist death metal-sounding album. Lee then ended the review stating: "Almost overnight, hordes of MySpace copycats sprang up, even lifting the band's logo font. This is where it all started - or ended, depending on your perspective."

Reviewer Kobak of Tiny Mix Tapes noted that "Job for a Cowboy are incredibly talented musicians. Their songs typically go through many tempo changes, ranging from the standard cruising metal yelp to the double-bass-drum, full-on Speedy Gonzales thrash. The problem lies in their reliance on well-worn metal clichés."

The track "Knee Deep" was central to a popular YouTube video in which the track was synchronized to a clip of the SpongeBob SquarePants episode "Band Geeks". The clip features various members of the SpongeBob SquarePants cast playing instruments with "Knee Deep" overlaid to it (originally in the episode appearing as performing the song "Sweet Victory" by David Glen Eisley).

Track listing

Personnel

Job for a Cowboy
 Jonny Davy – vocals
 Ravi Bhadriraju – guitar
 Brent Riggs – bass guitar
 Andrew Arcurio – guitar
 Elliott Sellers – drums

Production
Cory Spotts – recording engineer, producer
Cory Spotts and Andy Sneap - mixing
Joel Lauver – mastering

References

External links
Doom at Dark Lyrics

2005 debut EPs
Metal Blade Records EPs
Job for a Cowboy albums